Parastrophius is a genus of spiders in the family Thomisidae. It was first described in 1903 by Simon. , it contains 2 species.

References

Thomisidae
Araneomorphae genera
Spiders of Africa
Spiders of Asia